Wan'an Zhou or Wan'an Prefecture was a zhou (prefecture) in imperial China in modern southeastern Hainan, China. It existed from 662 to 1368, but between 742 and 757 it was known as Wan'an Commandery, and between 757 and 758 as Wanquan Commandery. The Song dynasty made it a military prefecture in 1074.

Counties
Wan'an Prefecture administered the following counties through history:
Wan'an, roughly modern northern Wanning. During Southern Han and Northern Song dynasty it was known as Wanning, but after 1136 its name was changed back to Wan'an.
Lingshui, roughly modern Lingshui Li Autonomous County. Between 1074 and 1080 it was part of Wan'an County.
Fuyun, roughly modern western Wanning.
Boliao, roughly modern southern Wanning.

Both Fuyun and Boliao were abolished at the end of the Tang dynasty.

References

 
 
 

Prefectures of the Tang dynasty
Guangnan West Circuit
Prefectures of Southern Han
Former prefectures in Hainan
Prefectures of the Yuan dynasty
662 establishments
7th-century establishments in China
1368 disestablishments in Asia
14th-century disestablishments in China